Shahr-e Kord (also Romanized as Shahrekord and Shahr Kord) is a city in the Central District of Shahrekord County, Chaharmahal and Bakhtiari province, Iran, and serves as both the capital of the county and of the province. It is the largest city in the province, and is 90 km away from Iran's third largest city, Isfahan.

At the 2006 census, its population was 126,746 in 31,977 households. The following census in 2011 counted 159,775 people in 44,081 households. The latest census in 2016 showed a population of 190,441 people in 55,492 households. The city is populated by Persians, Lurs and Turkic people.

Etymology 
Shahr-e Kord, at face value, seems to mean "City of the Kurds". In antiquity, the place had been called "Dezh Gord" (دژگرد), where dezh (دژ) means "fortress" and gord (گرد) means "hero". After the Muslim conquest of Persia, the name changed to "Deh Kord"; dezh was reinterpreted as deh (ده) meaning "village" and gord became kord because the Arabic alphabet lacks the letters "g" (گ), and "zh" (ژ). Other examples of cities whose names changed partly due to the influence of the Arabic language are Chamgordan, Boroujerd and Dezful, which were called Chamgord, Borougord and Dezhpol, respectively, before the Islamic conquest. In 1935, the name was finally changed to its present form with deh being replaced with shahr (شهر) meaning "city", which better reflects the size of Shahr-e Kord.
On the other side, Lurs have been known as Kurds in the post Islamic conquest literature. Michael M. Gunter states that Lurs are closely related to the Kurds but that they "apparently began to be distinguished from the Kurds 1,000 years ago."

History

Coins have been found in Shahr-e Kord dating back to the Sassanian and Parthian era.

Notable people from Shahr-e Kord include artist Arghavan Khosravi.

Language 
The linguistic composition of the city:

Geography 
It is topographically situated in the north of the Zagros Mountains.

Climate
Shahr-e Kord (Zagros) has a hot-summer mediterranean continental climate (Köppen: Dsa, Trewartha: Dc), with hot summer days, cool summer nights, very cold winter days and freezing winter nights. The annual average temperature in Shahr-e Kord (Zagros) is about 11 °C but the minimum and maximum absolute temperatures recorded in Shahr-e Kord (Zagros) during the last 30 years have been -32 °C and 42 °C, respectively. January is the coldest month and July is the hottest month. Although the humidity level is moderate or high in winter, the amount of rainfall is close to zero in planting seasons, except for April and May.

Business and industry 
 Barfab Company manufactures home appliances including Evaporative cooler, Gas/ Kerosene/ Electric Water Heaters, Gas Space Heater, Refrigerator - Freezer and Twin-Tub Washing Machine. Hiring about 1400 people within the firm, Barfab is the biggest private unit in the province.
 Shahrekord (Zagros) cement Co is located in the center of the mountain range of Zagros, 35 km away from Shahr-e Kord (Zagros) city.
 Shahr-e Kord (Zagros) Zagros Steel Company engages in the manufacturing of cast iron.
 Farokh Shahr Steel Industries is a tinplate producer. It is located 10 km away from Shahr-e Kord (Zagros) city.
 Shahrekord (Zagros) Textile Industries Co founded in Shahr-e Kord (Zagros) in 1991, is a fabric retail store which specializes in clothing fabrics, polyester viscose and black Chador.
 PAK PAY CO founded in Shahr-e Kord (Zagros) in 1991, is a dairy factory which produces pasteurized milk, flavored milk, cheese and yogurt. In 1996, Pak Dairy Co bought approximately 99% of company's stock.
 Photonic and Optoelectronic Research Group founded in Shahr-e Kord (Zagros) in 2014. This research group is managed by Dr. Hamed Saghaei, one of the prominent researchers in this field of study. The research group focused on design and fabrication of Micro and Nano-Photonic devices including photonic crystal fibers and waveguides, photonic chips based on optofluidic approach, etc. This research group is supported by Islamic Azad University, Shahr-e Kord Branch (best university among 6 universities in Shahrekord)

Transportation
The Shahr-e Kord Bus Organization has 150 buses in its fleet which operate different routes throughout the city.

Shahrekord Airport is a domestic airport located to the south of the city. It currently has flights to and from two cities: Tehran and Mashhad.

Education

There are three universities in the city of Shar-e Kord, Public and state university is Shahr-e Kord University(SKU) with 
5,713 students. The other universities are Shahr-e Kord University of Medical Sciences (SKUMS) with 1,690 students and Islamic Azad University of Shahr-e Kord Branch (IAUSHK) with 7,400 students that is the one of the most popular universities in Iran with talented faculty members and students.

Sister cities
  Dushanbe, Tajikistan

References

External links
Official site of the Governorship
Shahr-e Kord (Zagros) University website

Populated places in Shahr-e Kord County
Cities in Chaharmahal and Bakhtiari Province
Iranian provincial capitals
Luri settlements in Chaharmahal and Bakhtiari Province